Sidney Allen Gautreaux  (May 4, 1912 – April 19, 1980), was a former professional baseball catcher in the Major Leagues for the Brooklyn Dodgers during the 1936 and 1937 seasons.

External links

1912 births
1980 deaths
Major League Baseball catchers
Baseball players from Louisiana
Brooklyn Dodgers players
People from Terrebonne Parish, Louisiana
People from Morgan City, Louisiana
Baton Rouge Solons players
Elmira Colonels players
Elmira Pioneers players
Memphis Chickasaws players
Anniston Rams players
Lancaster Red Roses players
Oklahoma City Indians players
New Iberia Cardinals players
New Iberia Rebels players
Houma Indians players
Minor league baseball managers